Sockpuppet or sock puppet can refer to:

Sock puppet, a cloth hand puppet made from a stocking or sock
Sock puppet account, an online identity used for the purpose of deception

See also
"Sock Puppets" (Homeland), an episode from the American television drama series Homeland